Peder Claussøn Friis (1 April 1545 – 15 October 1614) was a Norwegian clergyman, author and historian. He is most associated with his translation of Snorre Sturlessøns Norske Kongers Chronica.

Peder Claussen Friis grew up in  Audnedal in the county of Vest-Agder, Norway. Dating from about 1550, his father, Claus Friis, had been a minister in the Sør-Audnedal parish, of Lindesnes, Vest-Agder.   Friis received his initial education under the direction of the bishop of Diocese of Stavanger. Friis started his duties as a priest at age 20 as chaplain under his father. When his father died in 1566,  Friis took over the position as vicar and was the same year appointed as provost of the Deanery of Lista.  Sør-Audnedal parish was sizable covering the  Lindesnes peninsula and the lower part of Audnedal, west of Mandal including churches in Valle, Vigmostad and  Spangereid.  By 1575, Friis was made a member of the Cathedral chapter in Stavanger. Before 1590, he received the title of archdeacon.

His early writings included descriptions of Iceland (1580), Faroe Islands (1592), Greenland (1596) and Norwegian natural history (1599). 
In 1599, Axel Gyldenstjerne,  Governor-general of Norway,  gave him the task of translating Old Norse transcripts, including the Bagler sagas and works by Snorri Sturluson including Norske Kongers Chronica. None of the publications of Peder Claussen were printed while he was alive. The first publication of Norske kongers chronic  was printed in Copenhagen during 1632.

Historian Frederik Winkel Horn said of him: "He rendered great services to the history of Norway by his translation of the old sagas of the kings. Like Vedel's his work is marked by its excellent style. This also applies to his other writings, as for instance his Norriges og omliggende Oers Beskrivelse—a description of Norway and adjacent islands—in which is found historical material of value. His language is remarkably pure and his style is even and artless."

Primary sources
A prime source of information regard Peder Claussøn Friis can be found in Om Peder Claussøn Friis og hans skrifter by Gustav Storm (1881).

References

External links
 Digitized version of Norriges oc Omliggende Øers sandfærdige Besschriffuelse (1632)

1545 births
1614 deaths
Norwegian male writers
16th-century Norwegian historians
17th-century Norwegian historians
People from Vest-Agder
People from Lindesnes
17th-century Norwegian Lutheran clergy
16th-century Norwegian Lutheran clergy